Coochiemudlo Island is a small island in the southern part of Moreton Bay, near Brisbane, in South East Queensland, Australia. It is also the name of the locality upon the island, which is within the local government area of Redland City.

Geography 
A natural cliff composed of iron-rich rock is exposed on the south western side of the island. Sandy beaches wrap around the island's southern, eastern and northern sides. Mangroves cover the western foreshore of the island.

History
The name Coochiemudlo is the English language version of the Yuggera words kutchi (meaning red) and mudlo (meaning stone).

The British explorer Matthew Flinders landed on Coochiemudlo Island on 19 July 1799, while he was mapping the southern part of Moreton Bay.  The original European name was Innis Island from 1825 to 1850. The island celebrates Flinders Day annually, commemorating the landing of Flinders. The celebrations are usually held on a weekend near 19 July, the actual date of the landing.

Over 43% were more than 54 years old. Of families 58.2% were couples without children. The most common responses for religious affiliation were "No Religion" at 24.2% which is well above the Australian average of 18.7%. 269 said that they were in the workforce and 60% were in full-time occupations while 28% were working part-time. Only 5% of the island's workforce said they were unemployed. The major areas of employment were Hospitals, Local Government Administration, Other Social Assistance Services, Residential Care Services and Building Completion Services. The median weekly household income was $616, compared with $1,027 in Australia. 

The median age of the Coochiemudlo Island population was 52 years, 15 years above the national median of 37. 67.8% of people living in Coochiemudlo Island were born in Australia. The other top responses for country of birth were England 7.8%, New Zealand 6.1%, Germany 1%, Croatia 1%, Philippines 0.7%. 88% of people spoke only English at home; the next most common languages were 0.6% German, 0.6% Indonesian, 0.6% Serbian, 0.4% Dutch, 0.4% Swedish.

Transport and services

The island is serviced by a passenger ferry, operating approximately every half-hour between about 5:00am and 11:00pm. A vehicular barge also operates regular services to and from the island.  Due to the relatively small area, a car is not essential for getting around. 

The island's community hub, Curlew Café, is a BYO cafe situated not far from the jetty, providing breakfasts, lunches and occasional Friday night dinners, essentials (groceries, meat, ice creams, newspapers). The island also has a licensed restaurant, known as Oasis on Coochiemudlo.

A range of accommodation options are available including Seminara Apartments, airbnb and holiday homes.

The island's newspaper, the Coochie Island News, was established in February 2019 and has a readership of approximately 3,000 in print and online. Its mission is to publish inspiring and positive content that showcases the island's strengths and its pages feature news, articles, fishing and boating reports and stories, health/wellbeing articles, poetry and book reviews written by island contributors, as well as interviews with creatives and island residents. It includes a business directory and directory of community activities, groups and their contacts. Its last edition was January 2023. 

A podcast featuring interviews with island residents, experts on island life and Australia's demographer Bernard Salt was launched in 2020.

Wildlife

There are many types of wildlife on the island, with its birdlife including sea eagles, brahmany kites, magpies, rosellas, butcher birds, pheasant coucals and a colony of stone curlews which are counted each year.

The waters around Coochiemudlo contain dugongs, turtles and dolphins.

There is a walk through the Melalueca Wetland Reserve with its variety of native plants and trees.

A fauna survey was conducted there in 2016.

Amenities
The island's Community Hall has views of Moreton Bay and the mainland. The hall provides the community with a venue for a number of activities, including yoga, tai chi, indoor bowls, art shows, and meetings.

Coochiemudlo's southern beach (main beach) is patrolled by the surf lifesaving association. A 'Nippers' program is available, and caters for both on-island, and off-island children. The surf lifesavers have the use of a building with a first-aid room.

Other facilities include a BMX track, cricket pitch and football oval, bowls/croquet lawn, 9-hole golf course, 2 tennis courts, gym, and a library beneath the Community Hall.

Coochie Community Family Church conduct their services in the Pine Ridge Chapel at 11 Shirley Street; it is part of the Wesleyan Methodist Church.

Attractions 
The sandy beaches of Coochiemudlo Island provide safe swimming. 

Coochie is also a destination for sailors.  As the island is surrounded on three sides by sandy beaches, and there is always a sheltered beach regardless of the wind direction.  Sailing craft range from sailboards, off-the-beach catamarans and dinghies to larger motor and sail yachts.  A deep water anchorage and moorings are located to the south of the island near the jetty and boat ramp.

Fishing is also a common pastime, with species such as bream, whiting, flathead, flounder, tailor, cod, and snapper, amongst others, to be found in the waters around the island.

Housing styles

Housing styles on Coochiemudlo range from traditional 1950s fibro beach shacks, contemporary light weight beach houses, relocated Queenslander houses, and conventional suburban brick and tile.

See also

 List of islands of Queensland

References

External links
 Coochie Island News
History of Coochiemudlo Island
 Moreton Bay: Queensland Places
 Coochiemudlo Island Pine Ridge Chapel columbarium
 Redland Council Open Space Plan
Start a New Life Living on an Island Podcast

Islands of Moreton Bay
Suburbs of Redland City
Pre-Separation Queensland
Localities in Queensland